Paul Constantine Pappas (born 1934) is an American writer. He is professor of history at West Virginia Institute of Technology.

Publications
 United States and the Greek War for Independence 1821-1828, New York: Columbia University Press, 1985
 Pappas, Paul Constantine. Jesus' tomb in India : the debate on his death and Resurrection. Berkeley, California: Asian Humanities Press, an imprint of Jain Publishing Company, 1991.

Articles:
 "A Portrait of Early American Journalism West of the Alleghenies" 1969

References

1934 births
American Jains
Living people
Swoon hypothesis